Robert Carr Bosanquet (1871–1935) was a British archaeologist, operating in the Aegean and Britain and teaching at the University of Liverpool from 1906 to 1920 as the first holder of the Chair of Classical Archaeology there.

Life and work

Bosanquet was born in London on 7 June 1871, the son of Charles Bertie Pulleine Bosanquet, of Rock Hall, Alnwick, Northumberland.  He was educated at Eton College and at Trinity College, Cambridge, where he was a member of the Pitt Club.

Admitted in 1892 as a student at the British School at Athens – thus an approximate contemporary of John Linton Myres - he was among the first to lead excavations at the Minoan seaside town of Palekastro on Crete, from 1902 to 1905.  He also served as Assistant Director and then Director, from 1899 to 1906, of the British School, during one of its productive periods as a research centre. He ran other important excavations on newly independent Crete, inland at Praisos (1901–02) and initiated the School's major campaigns at the city of Sparta on the Greek mainland before he went to Liverpool,

Bosanquet’s first Romano-British excavations were as a young man, at the fort of Housesteads on Hadrian's Wall in 1898, arguably better conceptualised, extensive enough and very well published, compared to what had gone before.  As part of Liverpool's contribution to then-new Age of the Excavation Committee in Britain that ran from c1890 (Silchester) to the arrival of full-time professional archaeological units by the early 1970s, Bosanquet organised Roman military site fieldwork for the short-lived Committee for Excavation and Research in Wales and the Marches, alongside his Liverpool colleague Prof John Myres, at Caerleon and Caersws.   This work helped set the research agenda for much of the following century. He was a founder-Commissioner of the Welsh archaeological recording body the Royal Commission on the Ancient and Historical Monuments of Wales, running alongside his Welsh fieldwork of 1908–09, helping to visit and synthesise the archaeology of many counties through the Commission's Inventories and developing an interest in hillfort archaeology. [Mortimer Wheeler], who knew him and was in a sense Bosanquet's successor in Wales, situated his own early excavations ‘in direct line of descent from those instituted by him and the Liverpool Committee‘.

After exhausting wartime service in hospital organisation and relief work in Albania, Corfu and Salonica, 1915–17, Bosanquet soon after retired from teaching at Liverpool. In his retirement in northern England (Northumbria), at the family home at Rock, he became a respected local archaeologist, but published little of his great store of knowledge on the nature and date of Roman imports north of the frontiers in Britain, Holland, Germany and Denmark. In retirement, he had written to his son Charles in 1927: ‘That the attraction of this place and its tradition is strong, is proved by the curious way in which, for three generations, we have given up very different occupations to settle here; but I think that R.W.B. the parson, C.B. P.B. the social reformer and R.C.B. the archaeologist, would have done better work here if they had spent more of their lives in the North, and had a business training into the bargain …’,. His later obituaries – he died in 1935 – focus chiefly on his character and on his pre- and post-Liverpool activities.

Marriage and family
He married Ellen Sophia Hodgkin (1875–1965), a history graduate from Somerville College, Oxford and daughter of Thomas Hodgkin (historian) and his wife Lucy, daughter of Sarah and Alfred Fox of Falmouth. They had five children:
Charles (born 1903), married Barbara Schiefflin in 1931
Violet (born 1907) married John Pumphrey in 1931
Diana (born 1909) married Henry Hardman in 1937
Lucy (born 1911) married Michael Gresford Jones in 1933
David (born 1916) married Camilla Ricardo in 1941

References

External links

 

1871 births
1935 deaths
British archaeologists
Academics of the University of Liverpool
People educated at Eton College
Alumni of Trinity College, Cambridge
Directors of the British School at Athens
British expatriates in Greece